Gaylor is an unincorporated community in Wayne County, in the U.S. state of Missouri. The community was on the Black River south of Clearwater Lake approximately one mile north of Leeper.

A variant name was "Chilton".

References

Unincorporated communities in Wayne County, Missouri
Unincorporated communities in Missouri